was a protected cruiser built in France for the Imperial Japanese Navy (IJN) by Forges et Chantiers de la Gironde during the 1880s as the Japanese were not yet able to build warships of her size in Japan. Completed in 1886, the ship disappeared somewhere between Singapore and Japan on her delivery voyage with the loss of all hands.

Background
In the early 1880s, Navy Minister Kawamura Sumiyoshi was struggling to reconcile his desire for expansion in the face of the growing Chinese Beiyang Fleet with Japan's limited financial resources. Two developments offered Kawamura a way to resolve his problems. First, the French development of the  naval doctrine which emphasized the use of cheap torpedo boats and heavily armed light ships to offset an opponent's superiority in expensive, heavily armed and armored battleships. Second, the design of heavily armed, lightly protected cruisers by George Rendel of Armstrong Whitworth, as exemplified by the Chilean cruiser Esmerelda, fit the  doctrine. Rendel believed that his ships could be battleship destroyers as their higher speed would allow them to dictate the range at which the battle was fought or they could disengage at need.

Desiring another ship to match the British-built ships, he sent a representative to France to order a comparable ship. Impressed by the reasonable price offered by Forges et Chantiers de la Gironde, a contract was signed on 22 May.

Description
Compared with the preceding British-built s, Unebi was an old-fashioned design, fully rigged for auxiliary sail propulsion. She displaced  and had a crew of 400 officers and enlisted men. Unebis hull was fitted with a ram and it had a considerable amount of tumblehome amidships to increase the traverse of the main guns and reduce blast damage from them firing close to the hull. While her metacentric height was never measured before her loss, it is believed that it may have been very low which would rendered her stability precarious. Reports from the ship on her delivery voyage discussed her excessive rolling motions.

Unebi had two horizontal double-expansion steam engines, each driving one shaft, using steam supplied by six cylindrical boilers.

Armament and protection
The ship's main battery consisted of four Krupp 35-caliber  guns, mounted on the upper deck in single mounts sponsoned out over the side of the hull. Most of her secondary armament of seven Krupp 35-caliber  guns were mounted amidships on the upper deck, three on each broadside. The remaining gun was mounted as a bow-chaser underneath the short forecastle deck. Defense against torpedo boats was provided by a pair of quick-firing  Nordenfelt guns, one mounted on the forecastle and the other on the stern. Short-range defensive weapons consisted of 10 quadruple-barreled  Nordenfelt guns and four 10-barreled  Nordenfelt machine guns, distributed about the ship. Unebi was also fitted with four  tubes for Schwartzkopff torpedoes.

Construction and loss

Unebi, named after Mount Unebi in Nara prefecture was laid down on 27 May 1884 at Forges et Chantiers de la Gironde's shipyard in Le Havre, the day before the contract was signed. The ship was launched on 6 April 1886, with Prince Fushimi in attendance and she was completed on 18 October 1886 at a cost of ¥1,812,673, far more than the ¥1,093,000 price in the original contract.

With a mixed crew of Japanese sailors and shipyard employees aboard, Unebi attempted to depart Le Havre for Japan on the 18th, but had to turn back when she ran into a storm that caused her to roll so heavily that her safety was endangered. The ship set sail on the following day and encountered weaker storms in the Mediterranean and after passing through the Suez Canal. A stronger storm caused Unebi to return to Aden, Yemen, where she off-loaded two of her main guns in an effort to improve her stability. After arriving in Singapore, the ship departed on 3 December, bound for Tokyo Bay, where she was expected to arrive on 12 or 13 December.

Unebi disappeared without a trace somewhere in the South China Sea. No survivors and no wreckage were ever found despite searching by ships from the IJN and the Royal Navy's China Station; the most popular theory is that the design was top-heavy due to its excessive armament and was unstable in rough weather. Unebi was officially declared lost with all hands and stricken from the navy list on 19 October 1887. A memorial monument to the missing crew of Unebi is located at Aoyama Cemetery in Tokyo.

The insurance settlement of ¥1,245,309 was applied to the construction of the cruiser . However, the Imperial Japanese Navy was reluctant to continue working with French shipyards after the Unebi disaster, and placed its order for the French-designed Chiyoda with John Brown & Company in Scotland.

Citations

References

 
 
 

 
 

Cruisers of the Imperial Japanese Navy
Ships built in France
France–Japan relations
Naval ships of Japan
1886 ships
Maritime incidents in December 1886
Missing ships
Shipwrecks in the South China Sea
Ships lost with all hands